Timothy A. Chorba (born September 23, 1946) served as the United States Ambassador to Singapore from 1994 to 1997.

He was born in Yonkers, New York, and attended Regis High School in Manhattan. He graduated from Georgetown University in 1968, where he was in ROTC and a member of the Philodemic Society. He studied International Relations in 1968-69 as a Fulbright Scholar at the University of Heidelberg He earned his law degree from Harvard Law School in 1972 and then completed his service in the U.S. Army.

Following his tenure, Chorba continued his work as a partner at Patton Boggs in Washington, D.C. Currently he is partner at AvaLerroux, LLP in Washington, D.C.

References

External links
Timothy Chorba's profile at the Council of American Ambassadors

1946 births
People from Yonkers, New York
Living people
Harvard Law School alumni
Ambassadors of the United States to Singapore
Georgetown University alumni
Regis High School (New York City) alumni
Heidelberg University alumni
American expatriates in Germany
Philodemic Society members